This is a list of newspapers in Georgia.

Caucasian Journal (Tbilisi), online, published in English with versions in Georgian and Armenian languages.
Netgazeti
 Publika
24 Saati (24 საათი) (Tbilisi)
Akhali Epoka
 Akhali Gazeti
Alia (Tbilisi)
The Financial (Tbilisi), weekly English-language newspaper
Georgia Today (Tbilisi), a biweekly English-language paper
The Georgian Times (Tbilisi), a weekly English-language paper
 Kviris Palitra
 The Messenger
 Mtavari Gazeti
 Rezonansi (რეზონანსი)
 Sakartvelos Respublika
 Svobodnaya Gruziya
 Vrastan (Tbilisi) — an official Armenian-language newspaper of the Armenian Apostolic Church in Georgia. Some Georgian.

See also
List of newspapers
Media of Georgia#Print media

References

 01
Newspapers
Georgia (country)
Mass media companies of Georgia (country)